Sodium vanadate can refer to:

 Sodium metavanadate (sodium trioxovanadate(V)), NaVO3
 Sodium orthovanadate (sodium tetraoxovanadate(V)), Na3VO4
 Sodium decavanadate, Na6V10O28